The Internationale is a 1990 album by Billy Bragg. Originally released on Bragg's short-lived record label, Utility Records, it is a deliberately political album, consisting mainly of cover versions and rewrites of left-wing protest songs. Although Bragg is known for his association with left-wing causes, this release is unusual; most of Bragg's recordings balance overtly political songs with social observation and love songs.

Versions
The album was originally released as a seven-track EP in 1990.

In 2006, as part of a planned series of reissues of albums in his back catalogue, The Internationale was remastered and reissued along with the seven tracks from 1988's Live & Dubious EP and five bonus tracks. Also included is a bonus DVD titled Here and There containing live concerts from East Berlin, Nicaragua and the Soviet Union.

Track listing

Disc one
Original album
"The Internationale" (Pierre De Geyter, Billy Bragg) – 3:45
"I Dreamed I Saw Phil Ochs Last Night" (Earl Robinson, Bragg) – 1:27
"The Marching Song of the Covert Battalions" (Bragg) – 3:59
"Blake's Jerusalem" (William Blake, Hubert Parry) – 2:30
"Nicaragua Nicaraguita" (Carlos Mejía Godoy) – 1:06
"The Red Flag" (Jim Connell, traditional) – 3:12
"My Youngest Son Came Home Today" (Eric Bogle) – 3:04

Live & Dubious EP
"Introduction" (live) – 0:57
"Help Save the Youth of America" (live) (Bragg) – 2:36
"Think Again" (live) (Dick Gaughan) – 4:21
"Chile Your Waters Run Red Through Soweto" (Bernice Johnson Reagon) – 3:09
"Days Like These" (DC remix) (Bragg) – 2:40
"To Have and to Have Not" (live) (Bragg) – 2:47
"There Is Power in a Union" (with The Pattersons) (Bragg, George F. Root, traditional) – 3:27

Bonus tracks
"Joe Hill" (Phil Ochs) – 8:23
"This Land Is Your Land" (Woody Guthrie) – 4:35
"Never Cross a Picket Line" (Bragg) – 3:38
"A Change Is Gonna Come" (Sam Cooke) – 3:58
"A Miner's Life" (traditional) – 3:01

Bonus DVD
East Berlin DDR – February 1986
"There Is Power in a Union" (live) (Bragg, Root, traditional) – 2:35
"Between the Wars" (live) (Bragg) – 2:31

Nicaragua – July 1987
"Nicaragua Nicaraguita" (live) (Godoy) – 1:07

Lithuania USSR – May 1988
"I Heard It Through the Grapevine" (live) (Norman Whitfield, Barrett Strong) – 2:07
"To Have and to Have Not" (live) (Bragg) – 2:21
"The Milkman of Human Kindness" (live) (Bragg) – 2:29
"Island of No Return" (live) (Bragg) – 3:24
"Introduction to Between the Wars" (live) – 3:15
"Between the Wars" (live) (Bragg) – 2:21
"The World Turned Upside Down" (live) (Leon Rosselson) – 3:02
"Levi Stubbs' Tears" (live) (Bragg) – 3:15
"Help Save the Youth of America" (live) (Bragg) – 2:36
"A New England" (Bragg) – 2:04
"Wishing the Days Away" (Bragg) – 4:15
"People Get Ready" (Curtis Mayfield) / "Tupelo Honey" (Van Morrison) – 3:02
"Star" (David Bowie) – 1:56
"A13, Trunk Road to The Sea" (Bobby Troup) – 2:17

Personnel

Musicians
Billy Bragg – acoustic guitar, electric guitar, vocals
Cara Tivey – piano, vocals, shakuhachi
Lorraine Bowen – clarinet, soprano recorder, piano, accordion, organ
The Christie Tyler Cory Band – brass
Côr Cochion Caerdydd – vocals
Marc Duff – whistles
Jim Sutherland – bodhran, percussion
Dick Gaughan – vocals
Wiggy – bass guitar, vocals
Charlie Llewellin – drum, cymbal
Grant Showbiz – vocals
David Bedford – arrangement and conducting

Production
Grant Showbiz – producer, reissue producer
Wiggy – producer, compiled by
Kenny Jones – producer
Charlie Llewellin – engineer
Derek Bolland – engineer
Peter Haigh – engineer
Step Parikian – engineer
Tim Young – remastered by
Duncan Cowell – remastered by

References

Billy Bragg albums
1990 albums
Covers albums
Albums produced by Grant Showbiz
Political music albums by English artists
Cooking Vinyl albums